State Highway 173 (SH 173) is a state highway that runs for  from Jourdanton to Kerrville in south Texas, traversing through the Texas Hill Country.

History
The highway was originally designated on August 4, 1932 from Hondo southeast to Devine. On October 26, 1932, it extended southeast to Pleasanton. On January 11, 1933, it was rerouted to end in Jourdanton. On October 16, 1933, this section from Devine to Jourdanton was cancelled. On May 14, 1935, it extended back to Jourdanton. On July 15, 1935, SH 173 was cancelled. On September 3, 1935, a road from Devine to Jourdanton was being investigated for preparation for restoration of this section of SH 173. On April 20, 1936, the entire route was restored. On September 26, 1939, the designated route was extended south from Jourdanton through Freer, absorbing most of SH 241, with an expected terminus at Hebbronville.  on January 29, 1942, the section from Freer to Hebbronville had been cancelled. On August 31, 1965, the section south of Jourdanton was transferred to SH 16. On February 21, 1972, SH 173 was signed, but not designated along FM 689 to Kerrville. On October 23, 1978, the section west of Loop 534 was transferred to Loop 534, but still signed as SH 173.. On August 29, 1990, the route was extended northward to Kerrville, replacing FM 689.

Route description
SH 173 begins at SH 16 just north of Jourdanton. SH 173 runs northwest toward Devine where it intersects I-35 in the south part of town. Leaving Devine, 173 turns running in a sharper northwest direction. Just east of Hondo, the highway interchanges with US 90. The highway turns to run in a more north-south direction, twisting and turning many times through canyons. SH 173 enters Bandera and intersects SH 16 for a second time. The two highways share a short overlap before splitting. Here, signs are posted advising trucks and through traffic to use SH 173 as a route to Kerrville instead of SH 16, as SH 173 is a shorter and faster route, while SH 16 traverses a hill with many sharp curves. SH 173 intersects SH 16 for a third time in Kerrville, where the highway ends.

Junction list

Notes

References

173
Transportation in Atascosa County, Texas
Transportation in Frio County, Texas
Transportation in Medina County, Texas
Transportation in Bandera County, Texas
Transportation in Kerr County, Texas